Ralph K. Pedersen is a nautical archaeologist from Levittown (Island Trees) New York, United States.  He was the DAAD Gastdozent für Nautische Archäologie at Philipps-Universität Marburg 2010–2013, and has been distinguished visiting professor in anthropology and Knapp Chair in Liberal Arts at the University of San Diego, and the Whittlesey Chair Visiting Assistant Professor in the department of history and archaeology at the American University of Beirut. He has been teaching online courses in archaeology in the History Department at Southwestern Assemblies of God University since 2009.

Research 

Pedersen holds a doctorate from the Nautical Archaeology Program at Texas A&M University. His dissertation entitled "The Boatbuilding Sequence in the Gilgamesh Epic and the Sewn Boat Relation" examines and reinterprets the construction of the Ark of the Deluge in light of archaeological and ethnographic evidence in Arabia, Africa, and India. The focus of this work is that the ark as depicted in the epic was of sewn construction, a determination that pushes back the technology to the 13th century B.C.  A popular article on this was the cover feature for Biblical Archaeology Review in 2005.

Pedersen has been the principal investigator for nautical archaeology projects in Lebanon and Saudi Arabia. He has been a team member of the excavation of the Bronze Age shipwreck at Uluburun, Turkey; served as daily field director for the 1991 excavation of a 17th-century wreck at Monte Cristi, Dominican Republic under USD Anthropology Associate Professor Jerome Lynn Hall; surveyed underwater in Bahrain in 1993; excavated a 1500-year-old shipwreck at Black Assarca Island, Eritrea; surveyed shipwrecks off New York's Long Island, and served as an associate director of India's Kadakkarapally Boat Project, which involved a thousand-year-old ship found under a coconut grove in Kerala. In 2004 he conducted an underwater survey at Tell el-Burak in Lebanon, and in 2007 in the waters off the early Bronze Age tell at Fadous-Kfarabida for the American University of Beirut. Pedersen has been a research associate with the Institute of Nautical Archaeology, based at Texas A&M University, since 1992.

In 2012, Pedersen along with colleagues from Philipps-Universität Marburg in Germany began a multi-year archaeological survey Saudi Arabia’s Red Sea coast to locate and document shipwrecks and ancient harbors.  Also in the same year he conducted a re-assessment of the archaeological site in Beirut, Lebanon known as the "Venus Towers Site," which was claimed by a local activist group to be a Phoenician port.  Pedersen's study refuted that determination as no evidence was found to support the maritime interpretation of the site, and that specific features within the site demonstrated the impossibility of the use of the place for ships.
In 2013, Pedersen conducted along with his Lebanese colleague Lucy Semaan, an underwater excavation of an anchorage site in the sea off Beirut that yielded Late Roman pottery as well as some Iron Age ceramics, and a Phoenician-era stone anchor.

In 2014, Pedersen founded The Red Sea Institute for Anthropological Research, the purpose of which is to promote the scientific inquiry of the Red Sea and surrounding areas-- focusing on the subjects of anthropology, archaeology, ethnography, and history--to further our knowledge of the zone and its peoples, to bring into better understanding the intercourse between Africa and Southwestern Asia from the earliest times into the present, and to provide opportunities for research. The institute's intent is to create a better understanding of the dynamics of intercultural maritime connections and exchange, the involved shipbuilding and engineering technologies, maritime exploitation strategies of coastal peoples and their environmental adaptability to arid coastal zones, as well as maritime migration from the prehistoric period into the modern era.

In addition to his doctorate, Pedersen holds a BA in Anthropology and Linguistics from the State University of New York at Stony Brook, and an MA in Anthropology/Nautical Archaeology from Texas A&M University.

References 

The Red Sea Institute for Anthropological Research. http://www.redseainstitute.org/

Interview: by Carsten Bergmann of the Deutsche Presse-Agentur. Schätze auf dem Meeresboden. Frankfurter Allgemeine Zeitung, 14 December 2010.

Interview: by Ulrich Thimm from Hessischer Rundfunk for the radio program "Mensch un Klima: Wetter im Wandel." Broadcast date, Spring 2011.

Interview: Auf der Suche nach alten Schiffswracks. Oberhessiche Presse, 13 Oct. 2010.

Interview: In The Hindu. May 2003.

Agius, D. Classic Ships of Islam. Brill, Leiden, p. 139.

Bass, G. "Underwater Archaeology in the Near East: Past, Present, and Future," in The Study of the Ancient Near East in the 21st Century. J. Cooper and G. Schwarz, eds. Eisenbrauns, Winona Lake, 1996. P. 137.

Belich J, Darwin J, Frenz M, Wickham C, editors. The prospect of global history. Oxford University Press; 2016.

Brandmeier, R. "Roads of Arabia: New finds of Aqaba amphorae in the Red Sea from a newly discovered wreck site at Jeddah/Eliza shoals." Polish Archaeology in the Mediterranean. December 2020.

Bossone, A.  "Roman Building Mistaken for Phoenician Port." Nature Middle East, 16 August 2012.

Blue, L. "The Red Sea."  In The Oxford Handbook of Maritime Archaeology.  Oxford University Press, 2011. pp. 495–512.

Haddad, Zeina. “The State of Underwater Archaeology in Lebanon.” Near Eastern Archaeology 73, no. 2/3 (2010): 170–75.

Institute of Nautical Archaeology Research Associates

Juchniewicz, Karol. "The port of Aynuna in Pre-Islamic period. Nautical and topographical considerations on the location of Leuke Kome." Polish Archaeology in the Mediterranean 26(2):31-42.

Pedersen, Ralph K. “The Marine Survey.” In Tell El-Burak I: The Middle Bronze Age, edited by Jens Kamlah and Hélène Sader, 29–36. Wiesbaden: Harrassowitz Verlag, 2019.

Pedersen, Ralph K. “Nautical Archaeology Surveys Near Jeddah, 2012-2013, and Their Connections to the Study of Red Sea Commerce.” In Stories of Globalisation: The Red Sea and the Persian Gulf from the Late Prehistory to Early Modernity, edited by Andrea Manzo, Chiara Zazzaro, and Diana J. de Falco, 301–13. Leiden: Brill, 2019.

Pedersen, Ralph K., Lucy Semaan, and Rupert A. Brandmeier. “A Preliminary Report on the Excavation of an Underwater Site near AUB Beach Ain El Mreisseh, Beirut.” Bulletin d’archéologie et d’architecture Libanaises 17 (2017): 263–74.

Pedersen, R. "Harboring History: How the Phoenicians Tamed the Sea and Created an Empire." Gateway. American University of Beirut. Winter 2011.

Pedersen, R.  "A Clench-Fastened Boat in Kerala, India." The International Journal of Nautical Archaeology 39.1 (2010): 110–115.

Pedersen, R. "Seeking Early Bronze Age Mariners: Undersea at Tell Fadous-Kfarabida, Lebanon."
The INA Annual, (2008), Institute of Nautical Archaeology.

Pedersen, R. "The Underwater Survey at Tell Fadous-Kfarabida, Lebanon."
Bulletin d’archéologie et architecture Libanaises (BAAL) 11 (2007): 17–23.

Pedersen, R. "The Byzantine-Aksumite Period Shipwreck at Black Assarca Island, Eritrea." Azania (2008)XLIII: 77–94.

Pedersen, R. "Was Noah’s Ark a Sewn Boat?" Biblical Archaeology Review 31.3, May/June (2005): 18–56.

Pedersen, R. "Shipwreck in a Coconut Grove: The Kadakkarapally Boat." The INA Quarterly 31.2 (2004): 3-9. Institute of Nautical Archaeology.

Pedersen, R. "Traditional Arabian Watercraft and The Ark of the Gilgamesh Epic: Interpretations and Realizations." Proceedings of the Seminar for Arabian Studies 34 (2004): 231-238.

Pedersen, R. "Under the Erythraean Sea: An Ancient Shipwreck in Eritrea." INA Quarterly 27. 2/3 (2000): 3-12. Institute of Nautical Archaeology.

Phillipson DW. Foundations of an African Civilisation: Aksum & the Northern Horn, 1000 BC-1300 AD. Boydell & Brewer Ltd; 2012.

Pollard E, Bates R, B. ichumbaki E, Bita C. Shipwreck Evidence from Kilwa, Tanzania. International Journal of Nautical Archaeology. 2016 Sep;45(2):352-69.

Power T. The Red Sea from Byzantium to the Caliphate: AD 500-1000. Oxford University Press; 2012.

Saudi Commission for Tourism and Antiquities. "SCTA signs three agreements with German scientific organizations in the antiquities area."

Scheepers C. Phoenician ships: types, trends, trade and treacherous trade routes (Doctoral dissertation).

Seland, E. H.  Red Sea studies: a historiographical sketch. Polish Archaeology in the Mediterranean. December 2020.

Wachsmann S. On the Interpretation of Watercraft in Ancient Art. InArts 2019 Dec (Vol. 8, No. 4, p. 165). Multidisciplinary Digital Publishing Institute.
 
Wolter, S. Wracks künden von versunkenen Kulturen Thuringisch Landeszeitung. 14 August 2012.

Living people
American archaeologists
Year of birth missing (living people)
Phoenician-punic archaeologists